Zhufutun was a town of Zhengding County, Shijiazhuang, Hebei, China. In 2010, it forms the core area of Zhengding New Area. In 2017, Zhengding New Area was merged with Zhengding County and the territory of the previous Zhufutun Town is still informally called the Zhengding New Area.

See also
List of township-level divisions of Hebei

References

Township-level divisions of Hebei